Coptis (goldthread or canker root) is a genus of between 10–15 species of flowering plants in the family Ranunculaceae, native to Asia and North America.

Species
Selected species
Coptis aspleniifolia - fernleaf goldthread, spleenwort-leaf goldthread
Coptis chinensis - Chinese goldthread, Huang lian in Chinese
Coptis deltoidea
Coptis trifolia (syn. Coptis groenlandica)
Coptis japonica - Japanese goldthread, Riben huang lian in Chinese
Coptis laciniata - Oregon goldthread: California, Oregon, Washington State
Coptis occidentalis - Idaho goldthread: Idaho, Montana, Washington
Coptis omeiensis
Coptis quinquefolia
Coptis quinquesecta
Coptis teeta - Yunnan goldthread, Yunnan huang lian in Chinese
Coptis trifolia - threeleaf goldthread, savoyane, canker-root (Eastern Eurasia, Greenland, Saint Pierre and Miquelon, Canada, USA)

Uses
Coptis teeta is used as a medicinal herb in China and the Eastern Himalayan regions of India particularly in Mishmi Hills of Arunachal Pradesh where it is used as a bitter tonic for treating malarial fever and dyspepsia.  It is also believed to help insomnia in Chinese herbology.  The roots contain the bitter alkaloid berberine. Studies have shown that the species has become endangered both due to overexploitation as well as intrinsic genetic bottlenecks such as high cytoplasmic male sterility induced by genetic mutations. As a result of the synaptic mutation and ensuing male sterility the sexual reproduction in the species is significantly depressed. The dried roots (goldthread) were commercially marketed in Canada until the 1950s or early 60s, to be steeped into a "tea" and swabbed onto areas affected by thrush (candidiasis) infection.

Ecology
The species inhabits warm and cold temperate forests of oak-rhododendron association. It is occasionally seen growing under bamboo thickets around Mayodia region of Dibang Valley district in the Mishmi Hills of Arunachal Pradesh in India. It flowers during early spring March–April and sets fruit/seed in July–August. The seedlings are rare and are often found germinating on moss laden dead wood on the forest floor or even on moss laden branches of Rhododendron. A new subspecies was recognised in C. teeta by Pandit & Babu and was named as subsp. lohitensis, which is morphologically very different from subsp. teeta and it is geographically distinct and inhabits broad leaf forests in Delai Valley of Lohit district in Arunachal Pradesh, India.

References

External links
Coptis lutescens
Flora of North America: Coptis
Flora of China: Coptis

 
Ranunculaceae genera
Herbs
Plants used in traditional Chinese medicine